The Millennium Downtown New York is a hotel in Lower Manhattan, New York City, located at the southeast corner of Fulton Street and Church Street. The hotel is adjacent to 195 Broadway, with which it shares the block, and is located across Church Street from the World Trade Center. The building is 55 stories tall, with a total of 471 guest rooms and 98 suites.

History 
In 1984, AT&T moved out of its adjacent headquarters at 195 Broadway. The block bounded by Fulton, Church, and Dey Streets and Broadway, including 195 Broadway, was sold for $70 million to Peter Kalikow. Kalikow demolished two smaller structures near the block's western boundary. He considered two plans—those for an office building and for a hotel—switching between the plans before finally deciding upon a hotel. Kalikow built The Millenium Hotel at a cost of $200 million and it opened on June 10, 1992. Kalikow chose to intentionally misspell the name with one "n" as "Millenium" on the outdoor signage and official literature, even though the correct spelling of the English word is "millennium", in order to make the name more distinctive.

Soon after the hotel opened, Kalikow went into bankruptcy and was forced to sell it. Kalikow Fulton Church Realty sold the Millenium Hotel to Singapore-based City Developments Limited (CDL) in June 1994, for $75 million. At that time, Hilton began managing the property as The Millenium Hilton.

The Millenium Hilton suffered extensive damage from the terrorist attacks of September 11, 2001. Amateur video recorded by a guest at the 35th floor of the hotel on that day shows the proximity of the destruction, as well as initial directives from staff to shelter in place before the building was evacuated. The hotel was closed for over 18 months, while it was completely refurbished. It reopened for business on May 5, 2003. The U.S. flag which hung outside the hotel on 9/11 was recovered by hotel workers and is now on display in the lobby.

The hotel was renamed the Millennium Hilton New York Downtown in 2017, using the more conventional spelling. It was, for many years, one of four hotels owned by CDL subsidiary Millennium & Copthorne Hotels, that were not marketed as part of their Millennium Hotels chain. Instead, they were managed by Hilton Hotels Corporation. The others were the Millennium Hilton New York One UN Plaza, Millennium Hilton Seoul and Millennium Hilton Bangkok. The hotel ceased to be managed by Hilton on January 18, 2022.

References

External links
 Millennium Downtown New York

Hotels established in 1992
Hotel buildings completed in 1992
Skyscraper hotels in Manhattan
Financial District, Manhattan
Hotels in Manhattan
1992 establishments in New York City